Satbani is a village and union council (an administrative subdivision) of Mansehra District in the Khyber-Pakhtunkhwa province of Pakistan. It is located in Balakot tehsil and lies in an area that was affected by the 2005 Kashmir earthquake.  On 3 September 2007, survivors of the earthquake from Satbani, Ghanool, Garlat and Kawai Union Councils organised a protest in Satbani against the authorities for the delay in compensation.

References

Union councils of Mansehra District
Populated places in Mansehra District